GLT may refer to:

Transport
 Bombardier Guided Light Transit technology
 Gladstone Airport, Queensland, Australia
 Glenrothes with Thornton railway station, Scotland
 Great Lakes Transportation, an American company

Other uses
 Glatfelter, an American paper manufacturer
 Goal-line technology, in association football
 Great Lakes Theater, Cleveland, Ohio, US
 G-TELP Level Test, an English language test